This is a list of Superfund sites in Washington, DC designated under the Comprehensive Environmental Response, Compensation, and Liability Act.

See also
List of Superfund sites in the United States
List of environmental issues
List of waste types
TOXMAP

References

External links
EPA list of deleted Superfund sites in the District of Columbia
EPA list of current Superfund sites in the District of Columbia

District of Columbia
Environment of Washington, D.C.
Superfund